The Chicago Shamrox were a professional lacrosse team based in Chicago, Illinois, that played in the National Lacrosse League (NLL). The 2007 season was the Shamrox inaugural season. The franchise was awarded to the city of Chicago by the NLL on February 16, 2006, and the name "Shamrox" was chosen in May 2006.

Their first season started off with two consecutive wins, but after splitting the next two games, the Shamrox lost nine of the next ten games (including seven in a row) to finish with a 6–10 record. The Toronto Rock and Philadelphia Wings also had 6-10 records, but the Rock won the tiebreakers and made the playoffs while the Shamrox and Wings were eliminated.

Regular season

Conference standings

Game log
Reference:

Player stats
Reference:

Runners (Top 10)

Note: GP = Games played; G = Goals; A = Assists; Pts = Points; LB = Loose Balls; PIM = Penalty minutes

Goaltenders
Note: GP = Games played; MIN = Minutes; W = Wins; L = Losses; GA = Goals against; Sv% = Save percentage; GAA = Goals against average

Awards

Transactions

Trades

Roster
Reference:

See also
2007 NLL season
Chicago Shamrox

References

Chicago
2007 in sports in Illinois